Mac Gafraidh was the surname of a Gaelic-Irish Brehon family.

Overview

The Mac Gafraidh family were ollamhs to the Maguire of Fermanagh. The surname is now generally rendered as Caffrey.

Annalistic references

 M1478.12 Macrifferty, i.e. Ciothruadh, Ollav to Maguire in poetry ... died.

External links
 http://www.irishtimes.com/ancestor/surname/index.cfm?fuseaction=Go.&UserID=
 http://www.failteromhat.com/lo1876/fermanagh_i.htm

Surnames
Irish families
Irish Brehon families
Surnames of Irish origin
Irish-language surnames
Families of Irish ancestry